L'Aventurier is a French drama film from 1934, directed by Marcel L'Herbier, written by Marcel L'Herbier, starring Victor Francen.

Cast 
 Victor Francen: Étienne Ranson/Pierre Stols
 Blanche Montel: Marthe
 Henri Rollan: André Varèse
 Gisèle Casadesus: Geneviève
 Alexandre Rignault: Karl Nemo
 Kissa Kouprine: Madame Nemo
 Abel Tarride: Guéroy
 Lucien Pascal: Jacques Guéroy
 Jean Joffre: Framié
 Pierre Juvenet: the prefect
 Paul Oettly: the leader
 D'Ambreville: the old worker
 Jean Marais: the young worker
 Huchet: Félix

References

External links 
 
 L'Aventurier (1934) at the Films de France

1934 films
French drama films
1930s French-language films
French black-and-white films
Films directed by Marcel L'Herbier
1934 drama films
1930s French films